ORP Sokół, formerly HNoMS Stord, is one of four s of the Polish Navy. The vessel was built by Rheinstahl Nordseewerke GmbH in Emden, Germany (known there as the Type 207) for the Royal Norwegian Navy as HNoMS Stord. The vessel served with the Royal Norwegian Navy from 1967 until it was given to Poland in 2002. Sokół was modified in Gdańsk after the handover. The ship was decommissioned on 8 June 2018. In the same year, he joined the program about converting a ship into a museum ship. In July 2020, work began on the unit in order to prepare it for museum functions.

References 

Ships built in Emden
1966 ships
Kobben-class submarines of the Polish Navy
Submarines of Poland